The 1926 Women's World Games (Swedish II. Internationella kvinnliga idrottsspelen, French 2èmes jeux féminins mondiaux ) were the second regular international Women's World Games, the tournament was held between 27 – 29 August at the Slottsskogsvallen Stadium in Gothenburg.

Events
The games were organized by the Fédération Sportive Féminine Internationale under Alice Milliat as a response to the IOC refusal to include women's events in the 1924 Olympic Games.

The games were attended by 100 participants from 9 nations: Belgium, Czechoslovakia, France, Great Britain, Japan, Latvia, Poland, Sweden and Switzerland. Kinue Hitomi was the sole participant from Japan, she won the long jump with a new world record, she also won the standing long jump, came second place in discus, third in 100 yards, fifth in 60 metres and sixth in 250 metres putting Japan in fifth place single-handedly.

The athletes competed in 12 events: running (60 metres, 100 yards, 250 metres, 1000 metres, 4 x 110 yards relay och hurdling 100 yards), high jump, long jump, standing long jump, discus throw, javelin and shot put.

The tournament was opened with an olympic style ceremony, the opening speech was held by Mary von Sydow (wife of Oscar von Sydow). The games attended an audience of 20,000 spectators and several world records were set.

Results

 Each athlete in the shot put and javelin throw events threw using their right hand, then their left. Their final mark was the total of the best mark with their right-handed throw and the best mark with their left-handed throw.

Also Sophie Mary Eliott-Lynn competed at javelin throw coming fourth with a throw of 44.63 metres and Mary Weston finished sixth in the shot put.

Points table

References

External links
 Picture of the Belgian team
 Picture of the British team
 Picture of the Czechoslovakian team
 Film (SVT) from the 1926 Women's World Games
 Film (British Pathé) 1926 Women's World Games
 Mixed pictures from the 1926 Women's World Games

Women's World Games
1920s in Gothenburg
Women's World Games
Women's World Games
International athletics competitions hosted by Sweden
Women's World Games
World Games
International sports competitions in Gothenburg
Athletics in Gothenburg